Gaston Franco (born 4 February 1944 in Roquebillière, Alpes-Maritimes) is a French politician and Member of the European Parliament elected in the 2009 European election for the South-East France constituency.

Franco represented Alpes Maritimes' 5th constituency in the National Assembly as a member of the Rally for the Republic between 1993 and 1997. In addition, he is Mayor of Saint-Martin-Vésubie since 1989 and represented the Canton of Saint-Martin-Vésubie in the General Council until he resigned in 2008 to join the cabinet of the Mayor of Nice, Christian Estrosi.

In the 2009 European elections, he was the fourth candidate on the Union for a Popular Movement list in the South-East region, and was elected to the European Parliament.

References

1944 births
Living people
People from Alpes-Maritimes
Rally for the Republic politicians
Union for a Popular Movement politicians
MEPs for South-East France 2009–2014
Rally for the Republic MEPs